Heritage Park Zoological Sanctuary, also known as Prescott Animal Park Association (PAPA), is a non-profit animal sanctuary in Prescott, Arizona, United States.

History 
Heritage Park Zoological Sanctuary (formerly the Heritage Park Zoo and earlier, the Prescott Animal Park) was established in 1988 in Prescott, Arizona by Patricia "Tricia" C. Williams  Bob Matthews former board president , and several other volunteers who established a non-profit organization in 1985 called the Prescott Animal Park Association (PAPA).  Initially, the animal park was established in order to inherit the former Payson Zoo run by Randy Ferry but after the establishment of the association, Randy Ferry reconsidered and continued operations in Payson.  Today, this sanctuary's motto is "Conservation through Education" and is home to over 175 native and exotic animal with a focus on non-releasable wildlife, with no other place to live out their lives.

References

External links
 
 Photos of Heritage Park Zoo

Zoos in Arizona
Buildings and structures in Prescott, Arizona
1985 establishments in Arizona
Parks in Yavapai County, Arizona
Tourist attractions in Yavapai County, Arizona
Zoos established in 1985
Wildlife sanctuaries